The 176th Massachusetts General Court, consisting of the Massachusetts Senate and the Massachusetts House of Representatives, met in 1989 and 1990 during the governorship of Michael Dukakis. William Bulger served as president of the Senate and George Keverian served as speaker of the House.

Senators

Representatives

See also
 101st United States Congress
 List of Massachusetts General Courts

References

Further reading

External links
 
 
 
 
 
 
  (1964-1994)

Political history of Massachusetts
Massachusetts legislative sessions
massachusetts
1989 in Massachusetts
massachusetts
1990 in Massachusetts